Nån slags verklighet was released in August 2006, and is a Daniel Lindström studio album.

Track listing
Beslut (Lindström/Berger)
Ingen är som du (Lindström/Wallstén)
Annars stod vi aldrig här (Lindström/Wallstén)
Bara nu (Lindström/Berger)
Nån slags verklighet (Lindström/Wollbeck/Lindblom/Garvin/Berger)
Det finns inget bättre (Lindström/Söderberg)
Tänk om himlen föll (Lindström/Söderberg/Sahlin)
Sarah (Scocco)
Kristaller (Lindström/Wallstén)
Tyst och tomt (Lindström/Söderberg)
Du får aldrig vända om (Lindström/Röhr/Littwold)

Contributors
Daniel Lindström - singer
Jennie Abrahamson - choir
Oskar Söderberg - producer
Adam Kårsnäs - percussion
Jimmy Wahlsteen - guitar
Tobias Gabrielsson - bass
Gustav Karlöf - keyboard

Chart positions

References 

2006 debut albums
Daniel Lindström albums